The wingspan (or just span) of a bird or an airplane is the distance from one wingtip to the other wingtip.
The term wingspan, more technically extent, is also used for other winged animals such as pterosaurs, bats, insects, etc., and other aircraft such as ornithopters.
In humans, the term wingspan also refers to the arm span, which is distance between the length from one end of an individual's arms (measured at the fingertips) to the other when raised parallel to the ground at shoulder height at a 90º angle.

Wingspan of aircraft
The wingspan of an aircraft is always measured in a straight line, from wingtip to wingtip, independently of wing shape or sweep.

Implications for aircraft design and animal evolution
The lift from wings is proportional to their area, so the heavier the animal or aircraft the bigger that area must be.  The area is the product of the span times the width (mean chord) of the wing, so either a long, narrow wing or a shorter, broader wing will support the same mass.  For efficient steady flight, the ratio of span to chord, the aspect ratio, should be as high as possible (the constraints are usually structural) because this lowers the lift-induced drag associated with the inevitable wingtip vortices. Long-ranging birds, like albatrosses, and most commercial aircraft maximize aspect ratio.  Alternatively, animals and aircraft which depend on maneuverability (fighters, predators and the preyed upon, and those who live amongst trees and bushes, insect catchers, etc.) need to be able to roll fast to turn, and the high moment of inertia of long narrow wings, as well as the high angular drag and quick balancing of aileron lift with wing lift at a low rotation rate, produces lower roll rates.  For them, short-span, broad wings are preferred. Additionally, ground handling in aircraft is a significant problem for very high aspect ratios and flying animals may encounter similar issues.

The highest aspect ratio man-made wings are aircraft propellers, in their most extreme form as helicopter rotors.

Wingspan of flying animals
To measure the wingspan of a bird, a live or freshly-dead specimen is placed flat on its back, the wings are grasped at the wrist joints and the distance is measured between the tips of the longest primary feathers on each wing.

The wingspan of an insect refers to the wingspan of pinned specimens, and may refer to the distance between the centre of the thorax to the apex of the wing doubled or to the width between the apices with the wings set with the trailing wing edge perpendicular to the body.

Wingspan in sports
In basketball and gridiron football, a fingertip-to-fingertip measurement is used to determine the player's wingspan, also called armspan. This is called reach in boxing terminology.

Wingspan records

Largest wingspan
Aircraft (current):  Scaled Composites Stratolaunch — 117 m (385 ft) 
Bat: Large flying fox – 
Bird: Wandering albatross – 
Bird (extinct): Argentavis – Estimated 
Reptile (extinct): Quetzalcoatlus pterosaur – 
Insect: White witch moth – 
Insect (extinct): Meganeuropsis (relative of dragonflies) – estimated up to

Smallest wingspan 
Aircraft (biplane): Starr Bumble Bee II – 
Aircraft (jet): Bede BD-5 –    
Aircraft (twin engine): Colomban Cri-cri – 
Bat: Bumblebee bat –   
Bird: Bee hummingbird – 
Insect: Tanzanian parasitic wasp (Fairyfly) –

References 

Aerospace engineering
Aircraft wing design
Birds
Length
Anatomical terminology